Nathan Ross Chapman (April 23, 1970January 4, 2002) was a United States Army Sergeant First Class with the 1st Special Forces Group. He was the first American soldier to be killed by enemy action in the war in Afghanistan.

Early life and education
The son of Wilbur and Lynn Chapman, Chapman was born at Andrews Air Force Base, where his father was stationed at the time. Chapman grew up in a variety of towns across the United States, and graduated from Centerville High School, near Dayton, Ohio. He listed his hometown as San Antonio, Texas when he joined the military at the age of 18. He had never lived in San Antonio, but that is where his grandparents lived.

Career

Chapman's military career spanned 13 years and included combat service in Haiti, Panama, and the Persian Gulf War. In 1989, he parachuted into Panama as part of the invasion during Operation Just Cause. He also served in Operation Desert Storm and later completed selection for the Army Special Forces at Fort Bragg, North Carolina.

Assigned to the 1st Special Forces Group following the 11 September attacks, Chapman was directing troop movements from the back of a flatbed truck when he was shot. He did not die instantly from the attack, which also saw a CIA Paramilitary Operations Officer from Special Activities Division wounded. Although originally dubbed an "ambush", the military backed away from using the term.

He was posthumously awarded the Purple Heart and the Bronze Star. Forward Operating Base Chapman was named after SFC Chapman.

On May 18, 2015, the CIA acknowledged Chapman had been detailed to a six-man CIA unit known as "Team Hotel" and unveiled a star on their memorial wall in his honor.

Awards and decorations
SFC Chapman was awarded the following during his military career:

Personal life

Chapman, his wife Renae and two children lived in Puyallup, Washington. He was buried at the Tahoma National Cemetery in Kent, Washington.

There is a Nathan Chapman Memorial Trail in Pierce County, Washington.

On September 11, 2006, a casting commemorating Chapman was displayed "in Georgetown, Texas".

See also
 Special Activities Division
 Forward Operating Base Chapman attack

References

External links

 Bio at SOC.mil Archived

1970 births
2002 deaths
United States Army soldiers
American military personnel killed in the War in Afghanistan (2001–2021)
War on terror
Members of the United States Army Special Forces
People from Puyallup, Washington
United States Army personnel of the War in Afghanistan (2001–2021)
Burials at Tahoma National Cemetery